Lapa is a district in the subprefecture of the same name in the city of São Paulo, Brazil.

Districts of São Paulo

new:लापा